Beauty No. 2 is a 1965 American avant-garde film by directed by Andy Warhol and starring Edie Sedgwick and Gino Piserchio. Chuck Wein also has a role in the film but never appears onscreen. Wein wrote the scenario and is also credited as assistant director.

Synopsis
The movie has a fixed point of view showing a bed with two characters on it, Sedgwick and Piserchio. The film's writer, Chuck Wein is heard speaking but is just out of view. Sedgwick is wearing a lace bra and panties, and Piserchio, wearing only jockey shorts, engage in flirting and light kissing. Wein asks Sedgwick questions seemingly designed to harass and annoy her. Piserchio is more or less a bystander not interacting with Wein.

The dialogue was ad-libbed and no conclusions are reached in the film. The only conceivable climax is when Sedgwick finally becomes so mad at Wein's taunts, she throws a glass ashtray at Wein, breaking it.

Reception
Beauty No. 2 was filmed in June 1965 and premiered at the Cinematheque at the Astor Place Playhouse in New York City on July 17, 1965. Critical reviews were generally positive with some critics compared Edie Sedgwick's screen presence to Marilyn Monroe.

See also
List of American films of 1965
 Andy Warhol filmography

Footnotes

External links
 
 

1965 films
1960s avant-garde and experimental films
American avant-garde and experimental films
American independent films
American black-and-white films
Films directed by Andy Warhol
1965 independent films
1960s English-language films
1960s American films